Peculiar is a city in Cass County, Missouri and is part of the Kansas City metropolitan area within the United States. The population was 4,608 at the 2010 census. The town motto is "Where the 'odds' are with you."

History
Early settlers of the town came to Western Missouri by riverboat from Illinois, Iowa, Michigan, Pennsylvania, and Ohio. Peculiar also had families coming from Tennessee, Kentucky, and Virginia. On July 29, 1868, the county surveyor, Robert Cass, platted Peculiar and was filed as "The Town of Peculiar".

There are at least two versions of the story on how Peculiar received its name. The first involves the community's first postmaster, Edgar Thomson. His first choice for a town name, "Excelsior," was rejected because it already existed in Atchison County, Missouri. Several other choices were also rejected. The story goes that the annoyed Thomson wrote to the Postmaster General himself to complain saying, among other things, "We don't care what name you give us so long as it is sort of 'peculiar'." Thomson submitted the name "Peculiar" and the name was approved. The post office was established on June 22, 1868.

In an alternate version, according to Missouri folklorist Margot Ford McMillen, early settlers were searching for a location to farm. As they cleared a small rise and looked below, one remarked "Well that's peculiar! It's the very place I saw in a vision back in Connecticut." The land was purchased and eventually a village sprang up on it, which was named "Peculiar".

Peculiar incorporated as a village in the 1890s and became a fourth class city of the state of Missouri in 1953.

The city celebrated its centenary in July 1968. The celebrations continued for nine days and included an antique show and sale, a Lions Club championship rodeo, and an open class Western horse show.

Government
Peculiar is governed by a Mayor–council government system. The mayor is elected to a two-year term. The town council, called the Board of Aldermen, is composed of six members. Two members are elected from each of the three wards in the city. One alderman is elected each year for each ward to serve a two-year term.

Geography
Peculiar is located adjacent to U.S. Route 71 and the Burlington Northern Railway. Old Peculiar lies one mile to the east along the banks of the East Fork East Branch South Grand River.

Demographics

2010 census
As of the census of 2010, there were 4,608 people, 1,704 households, and 1,268 families living in the city. The racial makeup of the city was 94.9% White, 2.0% African American, 0.4% Native American, 0.3% Asian, 0.1% Pacific Islander, 0.8% from other races, and 1.5% from two or more races. Hispanic or Latino of any race were 2.7% of the population.

There were 1,704 households, of which 41.5% had children under the age of 18 living with them, 56.6% were married couples living together, 12.7% had a female householder with no husband present, 5.2% had a male householder with no wife present, and 25.6% were non-families. 21.1% of all households were made up of individuals, and 7.3% had someone living alone who was 65 years of age or older. The average household size was 2.70 and the average family size was 3.12.

The median age in the city was 32.8 years. 29.1% of residents were under the age of 18; 8.2% were between the ages of 18 and 24; 29.9% were from 25 to 44; 22.9% were from 45 to 64; and 10% were 65 years of age or older. The gender makeup of the city was 49.1% male and 50.9% female.

2000 census
As of the census of 2000, there were 2,604 people, 953 households, and 730 families living in the city. The population density was 744.8 people per square mile (287.3/km). There were 983 housing units at an average density of 281.2 per square mile (108.4/km). The racial makeup of the city was 97.20% White, 0.27% African American, 0.42% Native American, 0.35% Asian, 0.08% Pacific Islander, 0.19% from other races, and 1.50% from two or more races. Hispanic or Latino of any race were 1.46% of the population.

There were 953 households, out of which 42.6% had children under the age of 18 living with them, 60.7% were married couples living together, 13.1% had a female householder with no husband present, and 23.3% were non-families. 19.7% of all households were made up of individuals, and 8.6% had someone living alone who was 65 years of age or older. The average household size was 2.73 and the average family size was 3.14.

In the city the population was spread out, with 31.8% under the age of 18, 9.0% from 18 to 24, 31.2% from 25 to 44, 18.7% from 45 to 64, and 9.3% who were 65 years of age or older. The median age was 31 years. For every 100 females, there were 93.9 males. For every 100 females age 18 and over, there were 89.0 males.

The median income for a household in the city was $44,769, and the median income for a family was $48,534. Males had a median income of $36,921 versus $27,885 for females. The per capita income for the city was $19,104. About 5.7% of families and 7.5% of the population were below the poverty line, including 9.4% of those under age 18 and 11.7% of those age 65 or over.

Education
Public education in Peculiar is administered by Raymore-Peculiar R-II School District.

Peculiar has a public library, the 	Peculiar Branch library.

Media

Music 
In 2022, folksinger Willi Carlisle created an album titled Peculiar, Missouri; referencing the town of Peculiar, with one song mentioning a local Walmart and its "hideous halogen bulbs" in the general area of the same name.

Notable people
Carson Coffman, AFL player
Chase Coffman, NFL tight end
Paul Coffman, NFL player
Brutus Hamilton, decathlete and track and field coach
Tonya Knight, "Gold" American Gladiator

References

Cities in Cass County, Missouri
Populated places established in 1868
1868 establishments in Missouri
Cities in Missouri